The 2001 Hong Kong Sevens was an international rugby sevens tournament that was held in Hong Kong as the fourth leg of the 2000–01 World Sevens Series. The tournament took place at the Hong Kong Stadium on 30 March–1 April 2001.

The hosts, Hong Kong, finished third in Pool C but went on to defeat the West Indies 47–5 in the Bowl final. Defending World Sevens Series champions, New Zealand, successfully defended their Hong Kong Sevens title by defeating Fiji 29–5 in the Cup final.

Format
The teams were drawn into six pools of four teams each. Each team played the other teams in their pool once, with 3 points awarded for a win, 2 points for a draw, and 1 point for a loss (no points awarded for a forfeit). The pool stage was played over the first two days of the tournament. The top team from each pool along with the two best runners-up advanced to the Cup quarter finals. The remaining four runners-up along with the four best third-placed teams advanced to the Plate quarter finals. The remaining eight teams went on to the Bowl quarter finals. No Shield trophy was on offer in the 2000-01 season.

Teams
Like the previous tournament in Hong Kong, 24 teams took part with Russia and the West Indies making their World Sevens Series debuts. The participating teams for the tournament:

  Arabian Gulf

Pool stage

Pool A

Source: World Rugby

Source: World Rugby

Pool B

Source: World Rugby

Source: World Rugby

Pool C

Source: World Rugby

Source: World Rugby

Pool D

Source: World Rugby

Source: World Rugby

Pool E

Source: World Rugby

Source: World Rugby

Pool F

Source: World Rugby

Source: World Rugby

Knockout stage

Bowl

Source: World Rugby

Plate

Source: World Rugby

Cup

Source: World Rugby

Tournament placings

Source: Rugby7.com

Series standings
At the completion of Round 4:

Source: Rugby7.com

References

2000
rugby union
2000–01 IRB Sevens World Series
2001 in Asian rugby union